São Matias  is a parish of Beja Municipality, in southeast Portugal. The population in 2021 was 511, in an area of 70.23 km2.

References

Freguesias of Beja, Portugal